{{infobox venue
| name = Ganti Mohana Chandra Balayogi Athletic Stadium
| nickname = Gachibowli Athletic Stadium
| image = GMChfcstadium.jpg
| image_size = 280px
| image_caption = Night view of the stadium
| fullname = Ganti Mohana Chandra Balayogi Athletic Stadium
| former_names = 
| location = Gachibowli, Telangana, India
| coordinates = 
| broke_ground = 
| built = 2001
| opened = 2003<ref>{{Cite web|url=https://www.outlookindia.com/newsscroll/hyds-abandoned-sports-tower-transforms-into-covid-hospital/1809839|title=Hyds abandoned Sports Tower transforms into Covid hospital|website=outlookindia.com/}}</ref>
| renovated = 
| expanded = 
| closed = 
| demolished = 
| owner = Sports Authority of Telangana State (SATS)
| surface = Grass
| operator = SATS
| scoreboard = Yes
| estimated_cost = 
| suites = 
| architect = 
| main_contractors = 
| capacity = bucket chairs 30,000
| executive_suites = 
| dimensions = 
| acreage = 
| tenants = 2003 Afro-Asian Games2007 Military World Games Fateh Hyderabad (2016–present) Hyderabad FC (2019–Present)
}}
Ganti Mohana Chandra Balayogi Athletic Stadium, formerly known as the Gachibowli Athletic Stadium, is a multipurpose stadium situated in the Gachibowli suburb of Hyderabad, Telangana, India. It is located beside International Institute of Information Technology, Hyderabad (IIIT Hyderabad). The sports complex was built in 2002 by the N. Chandrababu Naidu Government to host the 2003 Afro-Asian Games. It is used mostly for association football matches as is it currently houses the current ISL champions Hyderabad FC. The stadium holds 30,000 people and contains an eight-lane 400m running synthetic athletic track, a 10-lane 100m sprinting track and a four-lane synthetic warm-up track. Inside the athletic tracks lies a football field  in size.

Structure

The highlight of the stadium's structure is the cantilevered roof covering the spectator stands. The simple yet innovative structural design allows a  span cantilever allowing the spectators an unobstructed view of the sporting events.  Diagonal yellow steel structural members act as tension members to balance out the forces of the cantilevered roof of the spectator stands. These members not only add to the exterior appearance, but also help in creation of a well-defined ambulatory path along the stadium.  Orange coloured corrugated metal sheets wrap around the inner and outer edges of the roof trusses. This inexpensive cladding enhances the appearance of the stadium greatly.

It is an ultra modern stadium with eight line competition synthetic athletic track and 4-lane synthetic practice track. It uses the latest high-mast lighting for day-night events and provides obstruction-free viewing for all spectators. The stadium was named in the memory of G. M. C. Balayogi, an incumbent Speaker of Lok Sabha who died in an air crash.

The 2003 Afro-Asian Games were held in this stadium. More than 30,000 people came to watch the opening ceremony. The opening ceremony was about two hours and forty minutes long with a laser show son-et-lumiere''.

About 2,800 Kuchipudi artistes performed a centuries-old dance on 26 December 2010 to earn a place in the Guinness World Records.

West block

Most of the services and administrative areas of the stadium are hosted in the west block. The west block also contains the entrance porch and lobby.
The facilities hosted in the west block are:
 Public address system
 Media Centre & Press Box
 3 service and one players’ entrance
 Score board control & Games management room
 Lighting control rooms
 Public address & announcement rooms
 VIP lounges, pantries & toilets
 Office & conference rooms

See also

 List of stadiums in Hyderabad, India
 2003 Afro-Asian Games

References 

Football venues in Telangana
Sports venues in Telangana
Rugby union stadiums in India
Kabaddi venues in India
Multi-purpose stadiums in India
2003 establishments in Andhra Pradesh
Sports venues completed in 2003
American football venues in India
Sports venues in Hyderabad, India
Athletics (track and field) venues in India